Horatio Pintea (born November 11, 1962) is a Canadian table tennis player. Originally from Romania, Horatio arrived in Canada in 1982. As a table tennis athlete Horatio has represented Canada in international competition from 1982 until 2001. During his time on the National Team he has participated in all major competitions in the world including the 1988 and 1996 Olympics as well as numerous World Championships, World Cups (teams, singles and doubles). Just to demonstrate his longevity on the team, Horatio has represented Canada in 5 Pan American Games ( the Games are held every 4 years ) and has managed to capture at least one medal in each of the Pan American Games

Over the years Horatio has accumulated a great wealth of expertise in the field of table tennis. While playing professionally in Germany from 1990 to 1994 he had the opportunity to work as a coach for one of the most successful professional table tennis teams in the German league: SPVG Steinhagen the host club of some great table tennis names: Peter Karlsson, Johnny Huang, Carl Prean, Torben Wosik, Richard Prause, Lijuan Geng, Nicole Struse, Jie Schopp just to name a few.

Since 2008 Horatio and Geng Lijuan have been coaching on a regular basis at the Geng Table Tennis Academy working with kids from 6 years of age to 15.

References

External links
 
 
 
 

1962 births
Living people
Canadian male table tennis players
Olympic table tennis players of Canada
Table tennis players at the 1988 Summer Olympics
Pan American Games medalists in table tennis
Pan American Games gold medalists for Canada
Pan American Games silver medalists for Canada
Pan American Games bronze medalists for Canada
Romanian emigrants to Canada
Table tennis players at the 1983 Pan American Games
Table tennis players at the 1987 Pan American Games
Table tennis players at the 1991 Pan American Games
Table tennis players at the 1995 Pan American Games
Table tennis players at the 1999 Pan American Games
Medalists at the 1983 Pan American Games
Medalists at the 1987 Pan American Games
Medalists at the 1991 Pan American Games
Medalists at the 1995 Pan American Games
Medalists at the 1999 Pan American Games